Two Royal Navy ships have been called HMS S1:

 , launched in 1914, was the lead boat in her class of submarines.
 HMS S1 was originally an experimental submarine, HMS Swordfish, the only member of her class and launched in 1916. The submarine was converted to a surface patrol boat in 1917 and renamed HMS S1.

References
 

Royal Navy ship names